Low-density lipoprotein receptor-related protein 4 (LRP-4), also known as multiple epidermal growth factor-like domains 7 (MEGF7), is a protein that in humans is encoded by the LRP4 gene. LRP-4 is a member of the Lipoprotein receptor-related protein family and may be a regulator of Wnt signaling.

Clinical significance 

Mutations in this gene are associated with Cenani Lenz syndactylism.

Autoantibodies against LRP4 have been connected to a small fraction of myasthenia gravis cases.

References

Further reading